was a village located in Nakatado District, Kagawa Prefecture, Japan, from 1890 to 1901.

On February 15, 1890, the villages of Ōsa (大麻村) and Ikano (生野村) merged to form the village of Asano. Tado District merged with Naka District to become Nakatado District on April 1, 1899. Then on November 3, 1901, Asano merged with Yoshida and Zentsuji villages, becoming Zentsuji-cho town. What was once Asano is now part of Zentsūji.

Asano
1890s in Japan